Trisophista is a genus of moths of the family Yponomeutidae.

The species of this genus are allied to Hyponomeuta though resembling Ethmia.

Species
Trisophista doctissima - Meyrick, 1923 
Trisophista pauli - Viette, 1967

References

Yponomeutidae
Taxa named by Edward Meyrick
Moth genera